Tiszakürt is a village in Jász-Nagykun-Szolnok county, in the Northern Great Plain region of central Hungary.

Geography

Ethnic affiliation of the population of the locality in 2001: Hungarian: 95,1%; Gipsy, Romany: 0,4%; unknown, did not wish to answer: 4,7%

Religious denomination of the population of the locality in 2001: Roman Catholic: 41,0%; Greek Catholic: 0,4%; Calvinist: 29,9%; Lutheran: 0,3%; belonging to other church/denomination: 0,3%; does not belong to any church/denomination: 18,5%; unknown, did not wish to answer: 9,6%

Attractions
Bolza Mansion
The Reformed Church was built in 1887, an eclectic style.
Roman Catholic Church.
Local History Museum of Tiszakürt
Granary Building.
World War I Memorial.
World War II Memorial.

Census data

References

External links
 Official site in Hungarian

Populated places in Jász-Nagykun-Szolnok County